Vadims Fjodorovs (born 14 March 1977 in Daugavpils) is a Latvian former football goalkeeper, currently a goalkeeping coach for Daugava Daugavpils in the Latvian Higher League.

He played for FC Dinaburg, but after the club's elimination from Virsliga in 2009, he became an unrestricted free agent and joined FC Daugava. In 2001, while playing for FC Dinaburg, Fjodorovs was voted Latvia's Goalkeeper of the Year.

He has also played for FC Tyumen in the Russian Second Division, FK Rēzekne and Lokomotiv Daugavpils.

Playing career

References 

1977 births
Living people
Sportspeople from Daugavpils
Latvian footballers
Association football goalkeepers
Dinaburg FC players
FC Tyumen players
FC Daugava players
Latvian expatriate footballers
Expatriate footballers in Russia
Latvian expatriate sportspeople in Russia
Latvian people of Russian descent